John Harold Hollingworth (11 July 1930 – 4 March 2018) was a British Conservative politician.

Hollingworth was born in Birmingham in July 1930. Educated at King Edward's School, Birmingham. In the Conservative election landslide of 1959, Hollingworth was elected Member of Parliament (MP) for Birmingham All Saints, a constituency that normally elected Labour MPs.  In 1964, Hollingworth lost his seat to Labour candidate Brian Walden. He died in March 2018 at the age of 87.

References

External links 
 

1930 births
2018 deaths
Conservative Party (UK) MPs for English constituencies
People from Birmingham, West Midlands
UK MPs 1959–1964